Equatorial Guinea did not compete at the 2011 World Championships in Athletics from August 27 to September 4 in Daegu, South Korea.

Team selection

A team of 2 athletes was
announced to represent the country
in the event due to the preliminary Entry List.  However, nobody appeared on the Official Start List.

References

External links
Official local organising committee website
Official IAAF competition website

Nations at the 2011 World Championships in Athletics
Youth
Equatorial Guinea at the World Championships in Athletics